Bishop Jacques-Victor-Marius Rouchouse (June 6, 1860 – December 20, 1948) was the first Roman Catholic bishop of Chengdu during the Chinese Republican Era, a post he held from 1946 until his death in 1948.

Biography 
Rouchouse was born in the city Saint-Étienne in eastern France. He received his ordination on June 30, 1895, as a priest of La Société des Missions Etrangères. From 1897 to 1904, he was supervisor of the construction of the Cathedral of the Immaculate Conception at Chengdu. On January 28, 1916, he received the dual appointments of Vicar Apostolic of Northwestern Szechwan and Titular Bishop of Aegeae. On April 11, 1946, he was appointed Bishop of Chengdu, a position he held until his death on December 20, 1948.  Bishop Rouchouse was succeeded as Bishop of Chengdu by Henri-Marie-Ernest-Désiré Pinault.

See also 
 Catholic Church in Sichuan

Notes

20th-century Roman Catholic bishops in China
1860 births
1948 deaths
People from Saint-Étienne
Roman Catholic missionaries in Sichuan
French Roman Catholic bishops in Asia
Paris Foreign Missions Society bishops